Events in 1964 in Japanese television.

Debuts

Ongoing
Galaxy Boy Troop, anime (1963-1965)
Mighty Atom, anime (1963-1966)
Tetsujin 28-go, anime (1963-1966)

Endings

See also
1964 in anime
1964 in Japan
List of Japanese films of 1964

References